The New Zealand Billie Jean King Cup team represents New Zealand in the Billie Jean King Cup tennis competition. It is governed by Tennis New Zealand.

History
A New Zealand team first competed in the Fed Cup in 1965. Its best results have been World Group quarter-finals in 1965 and 1971.

Due to a late withdrawal from a competition in 2011, New Zealand were banned from competing in the 2012 Fed Cup.
 
New Zealand chose to not enter a team in the 2015 and 2016 Fed Cups because they feared their team wouldn't be competitive.

Current team (2019)
 Paige Hourigan
 Emily Fanning
 Erin Routliffe
 Valentina Ivanov
Captain Sacha Hughes (AUS)

See also
Fed Cup
New Zealand Davis Cup team

References

External links

Billie Jean King Cup teams
Fed Cup
Fed Cup